Anton Strout (January 24, 1970 – December 30, 2020) was an American urban fantasy author, blogger, and podcaster.

Personal life
Anton Strout was born January 24, 1970, in the Berkshires. He was  raised in Dalton, Massachusetts, and graduated from Wahconah Regional High School in Massachusetts before majoring in English/Communications and Theater at Massachusetts College of Liberal Arts, from which he graduated in 1993.

Strout died on December 30, 2020. He was survived by his wife Orly Trieber Strout and two children.

Career
Strout wrote the Simon Canderous series, the first of which, Dead to Me, was published by Ace Books in 2008. Tim Davis, reviewing that title for Bookloons.com, wrote, "Fans of urban fantasy should especially enjoy Strout's engaging new protagonist and will, no doubt, look forward to Simon Canderous making a quick return in further adventures." The second novel, Deader Still, was published in 2009; the third book, Dead Matter, was published in 2010; the fourth book, Dead Waters, was published in 2011.

In addition to his novels, Strout wrote several short stories and maintained both his own blog and participated at the group urban fantasy blog, League of Reluctant Adults.

Strout hosted the Once & Future Podcast in which he interviewed guest authors.

Bibliography

The Spellmason Chronicles
 Alchemystic  (2012)
 Stonecast  (2013)
 Incarnate  (2014)

Simon Canderous series
 Dead to Me  (2008)
 Deader Still (2009)
 Dead Matter (2010)
 Dead Waters (2011)

Anthologies
"Scream" in the February 2015 anthology Blackguards: Tales of Assassins, Mercenaries, & Rogues (a prequel tale of the Simon Canderous universe)
"Stay" in the September 2014 anthology Streets of Shadows (part of the Spellmason Chronicles universe, featuring alchemist freelancer Caleb Kennedy)
"Hooked" in the March 2012 anthology The Modern Fae's Guide to Surviving Humanity
"Lowstone" in the February 2012 anthology Westward Weird
"Tumulus" in the December 2011 anthology Human For A Day
"Izdu-Bar" in the 2011 anthology After Hours: Tales From The Ur-Bar
"Marfa" in the 2011 anthology Boondocks Fantasy
"Lupercalia" in the 2010 anthology The Girls' Guide to Guns & Monsters
"Stannis" in the 2010 anthology Spells of the City (Note:  This story was the basis for the 2012 publication of Alchemystic:  Book One of the Spellmason Chronicles)
"for lizzie" in the 2009 anthology Zombie Raccoons & Killer Bunnies (part of the Simon Canderous series universe)
"The Fourteenth Virtue", in the 2008 anthologyThe Dimension Next Door (part of the Simon Canderous series universe)
"Lady In Red", in the 2007 anthology Pandora's Closet

References

External links

Anton Strout's official website

1970 births
2020 deaths
21st-century American novelists
21st-century American male writers
American bloggers
American fantasy writers
American male novelists
American podcasters
Massachusetts College of Liberal Arts alumni
People from Dalton, Massachusetts
People from East Windsor, New Jersey
Novelists from Massachusetts
American male bloggers
Urban fantasy writers